Ken Shadbolt (9 October 1921 – 21 April 2012) was an Australian rules footballer who played with Melbourne in the Victorian Football League (VFL).

Notes

External links 
	

1921 births
Australian rules footballers from Victoria (Australia)
Melbourne Football Club players
2012 deaths